The 2005 Hansol Korea Open was a women's tennis tournament and was held from late September to early October 2005, in Seoul, South Korea. It was a Tier-IV event on the 2005 WTA Tour. $140,000 was the prize money.

Entrants

 1 Seeds are based on the rankings of September 19, 2005.

Other entrants
The following players received wildcards into the singles main draw:
  Chang Kyung-mi
  Kim So-jung

The following players received entry from the qualifying draw:
  Vilmarie Castellvi
  Eva Hrdinová
  Martina Müller
  Saori Obata

Withdrawals
  Shinobu Asagoe (muscle injury during practice)
  Cho Yoon-jeong (back injury during practice)
  Émilie Loit

Finals

Singles

 Nicole Vaidišová defeated  Jelena Janković 7–5, 6–3

Doubles
 Chan Yung-jan /  Chuang Chia-jung defeated  Jill Craybas /  Natalie Grandin 6–2, 6–4

References

Hansol Korea Open
Korea Open (tennis)
Korea